Tom Brewer (born August 6, 1958) is an American politician serving as a member of the Nebraska Legislature from the 43rd district. Elected in 2016, he assumed office in 2017.

Early life and education 
Brewer was born in Casper, Wyoming and was raised around Gordon, Nebraska and Whiteclay, Nebraska. He earned a Bachelor of Arts degree from Doane University and attended the United States Army War College.

Career 
For 36 years, Brewer served as a member of the United States Army, including six tours in Afghanistan. Brewer was awarded two Purple Hearts. During his service, Brewer was severely injured by a grenade, losing his eye and suffering shrapnel wounds. Brewer was elected to the Nebraska Legislature in 2016, succeeding Al Davis.

As a legislator, Brewer has focused on veterans issues, sponsoring a bill to provide tax breaks to veterans. Brewer has advocated against Medicaid expansion, stating "These programs will each be trying to protect their piece of the budget pie. When the music stops, some of them won’t have a chair. It’s unavoidable."

In 2022, Brewer made headlines for visiting the front lines and meeting with local officials in Ukraine for a "mission" trip, saying he thought that if the US did not help Ukraine, then American troops would eventually be fighting Russians.

Personal life 
Brewer and his wife Kelli have two children. Kelli has served in the Nebraska National Guard. Brewer is a member of the Oglala Lakota tribe and the first Native American elected to the state legislature of Nebraska.

References 

1958 births
21st-century American politicians
Doane University alumni
Oglala people
Living people
Military personnel from Nebraska
Republican Party Nebraska state senators
People from Gordon, Nebraska
Politicians from Casper, Wyoming